Jordan Kerr and David Martin were the defending champions but decided not to participate.
Austin Krajicek and John Peers won the title, defeating Tennys Sandgren and Rhyne Williams 6–1, 7–6(7–4) in the final.

Seeds

Draw

Draw

References
 Main Draw

Fifth Third Bank Tennis Championships - Doubles
2012 MD